Release Yourself is second album by Graham Central Station, released in 1974. The cover photograph was taken at Old Saint Hilary's Church, Tiburon, California.

Track listing 
All songs written by Larry Graham except where indicated

"G.C.S." 	3:24 	
"Release Yourself" 	4:44 	
"Got To Go Through It To Get To It" 	3:42 	
"I Believe In You" 	4:51 	
"'Tis Your Kind of Music" 	5:41 	
"Hey Mr. Writer" 	4:03 	
"Feel the Need" (Abrim Tilmon)	3:53 	
"Today" 	6:43

Personnel 
Larry Graham - bass, guitar, ARP synthesizer, tambourine, lead and backing vocals, cover concept
Hershall "Happiness" Kennedy - horns, Clavinet, electric piano, tambourine, vocals
Willie "Wild" Sparks - drums
David "Dynamite" Vega - guitar
Robert "Butch" Sam -  organ, piano, tambourine, vocals
Patryce "Choc'Let" Banks - drum programming [funk box], tambourine, vocals
Emilio Castillo, Greg Adams, Lenny Pickett, Mic Gillette, Stephen Kupka - horns
Lenny Williams  - vocals
Technical
Tom Salisbury - cover design, photography

Charts
The album peaked at number twenty-two on the Billboard Top Soul Albums in 1974.

External links
 Graham Central Station-Release Yourself at Discogs
  - live on Soul Train 1975

References

1974 albums
Graham Central Station albums
Warner Records albums